Apocadelic is the debut and only studio album by British boy band Point Break. The album was released on 7 August 2000 and peaked at number 21 on the British Charts.

Track listing

The Video Breakers - PB Cassettes Message - VHS & DVD

 Opening
Let It Be Ft Ferry Aid 
Perfect Day Ft Various 99 
We Are The World 
Do We Rock 
 What About Us
Credits

Charts

References 

2000 debut albums
Point Break (band) albums
Warner Records albums